Bethlehem Airport  is an airport serving Bethlehem, a town in the Free State province in South Africa.

Facilities

See also
 List of airports in South Africa

References

External links
 

Airports in South Africa
Transport in the Free State (province)
Buildings and structures in the Free State (province)